Darya Mikhailovna Aslamova  (born September 8, 1969, Khabarovsk) is a Soviet and Russian journalist, writer, radio host. Columnist, special correspondent for the Komsomolskaya Pravda newspaper. Author of the book The Adventures of a Mean Girl (1994).

She worked as a military correspondent for the Komsomolskaya Pravda newspaper in   hot spots (Abkhazia, Nagorno-Karabakh, Cambodia, Ossetia, Tajikistan, Yugoslavia, Rwanda, Chechnya, Mali).

On the night of August 6-7, 2022, the Kosovo Police detained a journalist at the border with Serbia on suspicion of espionage. After interrogation, she was released and went to Serbia.

On January 15, 2023, due to the 2022 Russian Invasion of Ukraine, she was included in the sanctions list of Ukraine, it is supposed to block assets in the country, suspend the fulfillment of economic and financial obligations, stop cultural exchanges and cooperation, deprive Ukrainian state awards.

References

External links
 Интервью «Эху Москвы» (1999)
 Yevgeny Dodolev. Сексуальная эволюция  (2010)
Darya Aslamova. Дарья Асламова: Как я металась от садистов к мазохистам  (2003)

1969 births
People from Khabarovsk
Living people
Russian columnists
Russian women columnists
Recipients of the Medal of the Order "For Merit to the Fatherland" I class
Sanctioned due to Russo-Ukrainian War
Moscow State University alumni
Russian war correspondents
Sex columnists
Russian women journalists